Sopa de Caracol (Spanish for Snail Soup) Released in 1991 is an EP from the Argentine Ska, Reggae band Los Fabulosos Cadillacs

The EP was a mix of four songs that included the song that give name to the album along with a megamix from several of the band greatest hits like "Mi Novia se Cayo en un Pozo Ciego", "El Satanico Dr. Cadillac" and "Silencio Hospital" among others

The EP was awarded a gold certification.

Track listing 

 "Sopa de Caracol" Original song of La Banda Blanca de Honduras. (3:08)
 "El Genio del Dub" (New version) (3:41)
 "Megamix "LFC"" (6:45)
 "Demasiada Presión" (remix) (3:44)

External links 
Los Fabulosos Cadillacs Official Web Site
Sopa de Caracol at MusicBrainz
[ Sopa de Caracol] at Allmusic
Sopa de Caracol at Discogs

References 

Los Fabulosos Cadillacs albums
1991 EPs
Sony Music EPs